Holy Thursday is a poem by William Blake, from his 1789 book of poems Songs of Innocence. (There is also a Holy Thursday poem in Songs of Experience, which contrasts with this song.)

The poem depicts a ceremony held on Ascension Day, which in England was then called Holy Thursday, a name now generally applied to what is also called Maundy Thursday: Six thousand orphans of London's charity schools, scrubbed clean and dressed in the coats of distinctive colours, are marched two by two to Saint Paul's Cathedral, under the control of their beadles, and sing in the cathedral.

The children in their colourful dresses are compared to flowers and their procession toward the church as a river. Their singing on the day that commemorated the Ascension of Jesus is depicted as raising them above their old, lifeless guardians, who remain at a lower level.

The bleak reality of the orphans' lives is depicted in the contrasting poem, "Holy Thursday" (Songs of Experience).

The poem

References

External links
A comparison of extant copies of the original hand painted copies of "Holy Thursday" available from the William Blake Archive

Songs of Innocence and of Experience
1789 poems